Aerides quinquevulnera is a species of orchid found in the Philippines and in New Guinea.

References

quinquevulnera
Orchids of the Philippines
Orchids of New Guinea
Plants described in 1833